My France with Manu is an Australian television series screened on the Seven Network. The series follows French born chef and My Kitchen Rules judge Manu Feildel returning to his homeland, visiting friends and family, as well as cooking throughout the country.

The series was initially launched as a two part special, however following its success another two episodes were ordered.

The series inspired a spin-off, My Ireland with Colin, featuring another My Kitchen Rules judge Colin Fassnidge, which aired in April 2015.

Broadcast
The first episode premiered in New South Wales and Queensland on 6 April 2015 and in other states on 10 April 2015 on the Seven Network (due to an AFL match airing in other states). The second season aired its two episodes on 22 February 2015 and 1 March 2015.

Viewership

References

External links
 

Australian non-fiction television series
English-language television shows
Seven Network original programming
2014 Australian television series debuts
Television shows set in France